The 2007–08 FIBA Americas League was the first edition of the first-tier and most important professional international club basketball competition in the regions of South America, Central America, the Caribbean, and Mexico, with the winner of the competition being crowned as the best team and champion of all of those regions, as well as of the FIBA Americas zone. The first FIBA Americas League also included two teams from the United States, the Miami Tropics, and the PBL All-Stars, which was an All-Star selection team from the Premier Basketball League. However, the NBA is the first-tier competition in the United States, and it is in fact an international league, as it contains also a team from Canada. So teams from the United States and Canada are eligible to play at the competition because they belong to the FIBA Americas region. However, at the pro club level for those two countries, the FIBA Americas League would not be considered the 1st-tier league.

The competition began on December 4. The first stage was a round robin phase with four teams in each group. Each of the groups were played in different cities, (Guaynabo, Miami, Belo Horizonte, and Mar del Plata). The Final 4 of the league was played in a round-robin format from February 7 to February 9, in Mexicali, Mexico, home of the hosting team, Soles de Mexicali.

Teams 

The labels in the parentheses show how each team qualified for the place of its starting round (TH: Americas League title holders, LSH: Liga Sudamerican title holders):
LC: Qualified through a licensed club with a long-term licence
1st, 2nd, etc.: League position after Playoffs

Group stage

Group A (Guaynabo)

|}

Group B (Miami)

|}

Group C (Belo Horizonte)

|}

Group D (Mar del Plata)

|}

Quarterfinals

Game 1

Game 2

Game 3

Final 4
Peñarol got the first place in the round-robin group and won their first Americas League title due to a better point difference than the other two teams who had the same record (Soles de Mexicali and Miami Tropics).

|}

References
Liga Americas 2007 - Men Basketball, Latinbasket.com.

External links
FIBA Americas League 
FIBA Americas League 
FIBA Americas  
FIBA Liga Americas Twitter 
LatinBasket.com FIBA Americas League 
Liga de las Américas YouTube Channel 

2007–08
2007–08 in South American basketball
2007–08 in North American basketball